Abganerovo is a rural locality (a selo) and the administrative center of Abganerovskoye Rural Settlement of Oktyabrsky District, Volgograd Oblast, Russia. The population was 1631 as of 2017. There are 11 streets.

Geography 
The village is located in the upper reaches of the river Gniloy Aksay.

Ethnicity 
The village is inhabited by Russians and others.

References 

Rural localities in Oktyabrsky District, Volgograd Oblast